Presidential elections were held in Algeria on 16 November 1995, in the midst of the Algerian Civil War. The result was a victory for Liamine Zeroual,  head of the High Council of State at the time, who won 61% of the vote. The Armed Islamic Group of Algeria threatened to kill anyone who voted, with the slogan "one vote, one bullet", but official voter turnout was 74.9%.

Candidates
Liamine Zeroual, independent
Mahfoud Nahnah, candidate of the Islamist Movement of Society for Peace (MSP)
Said Sadi, candidate of the secularist Rally for Culture and Democracy
Noureddine Boukrouh, candidate of the Party of Algerian Renewal (PRA)

Conduct
Delegations of observers came from the Arab League, the African Union, and the United Nations, and reported no major problems.  The Armed Islamic Group had threatened to kill voters, but the elections passed with few attacks.  Voter turnout was high, despite the three largest parties of the 1991 parliamentary elections (the Islamic Salvation Front, National Liberation Front and Socialist Forces Front) calling for a boycott.

Results

References

Algerian Civil War
Presidential elections in Algeria
1995 in Algeria
Algeria